"Livet på en pinne" is a song recorded by Swedish television personality Edward Blom. The song was released as a digital download in Sweden on 26 February 2018 and peaked at number 51 on the Swedish Singles Chart. It took part in Melodifestivalen 2018, but did not qualify out of the first semi-final on 3 February 2018. It was written by Blom along with Thomas G:son, Stefan Brunzell, and Kent Olsson.

Track listing

Charts

Release history

References

2018 singles
2017 songs
Melodifestivalen songs of 2018
Swedish-language songs
Universal Music Group singles
Songs written by Thomas G:son